Nguyễn Thị Thúy Hằng (born 19 November 1997) is a Vietnamese footballer who plays as a forward for Women's Championship club Than Khoáng Sản and the Vietnam women's national team.

International goals
Scores and results list Vietnam's goal tally first.

References

1997 births
Living people
Women's association football forwards
Vietnamese women's footballers
Vietnam women's international footballers
Footballers at the 2018 Asian Games
Asian Games competitors for Vietnam
21st-century Vietnamese women